The Handsome Beasts are an English heavy metal band who surfaced during the new wave of British heavy metal.  Currently enjoying a resurgence in popularity, their album Beastiality is infamous for being featured on several "Worst album cover of all time" lists.

Their vocalist, Garry Dallaway, died of a heart attack on 20 August 2006.

Career
Original line up:
Garry Dallaway (Vocals)
Pete Malbasa (Drums)
Steven Hough (Bass)
James Stephen Barrett (Lead/rhythm guitar, backing vocals)
Past Members and Contributors:

 Ray Richman (Drums)
 Maz Mitrenko (Guitar)
 Marco Foley (Guitar)
 Mark Knight (Bass)
 Nick Foley (Hammond Organ, Keyboards)

Discography

Albums
Beastiality (Heavy Metal Records, 1981) (Note) this album was rated one of the worst cover arts ever because the cover art is a picture of Gary Dallaway squatting down naked in a pigpen caressing a pig
The Beast Within (Heavy Metal Records, 1990)
04 (Heavy Rock Records, 2004)
Rock and a Hard Place (Q Records, 2007)
Filthy Lucre (Heavy Metal Records, 2010)

Singles
"All Riot Now" EP (Heavy Metal Records, 1980)
"Breaker" EP (Heavy Metal Records, 1981)
"Sweeties" EP (Heavy Metal Records, 1981)

See also
List of new wave of British heavy metal bands

References

External links

English heavy metal musical groups
New Wave of British Heavy Metal musical groups